Guillermo Arellano Moraga  (21 August 1908 – 16 February 1999) was a Chilean football attacker.

References

External links

1908 births
1999 deaths
Chilean footballers
Chile international footballers
Colo-Colo footballers
1930 FIFA World Cup players
Association football forwards